is a passenger railway station located in the city of Akashi, Hyōgo Prefecture, Japan, operated by the West Japan Railway Company (JR West).

Lines

Station layout
The station consists of two elevated island platforms with the station building underneath. Platforms 1 and 2 are for electrified train service and Platform 3 and 4 are for non-electrified trains. The station has a Midori no Madoguchi staffed ticket office.

Platforms

Adjacent stations

|-
!colspan=5|JR West

History
Akashi Station opened on 1 November 1888. With the privatization of the Japan National Railways (JNR) on 1 April 1987, the station came under the aegis of the West Japan Railway Company.

Station numbering was introduced in March 2018 with Akashi being assigned station number JR-A73.

Passenger statistics
In fiscal 2019, the station was used by an average of 53,486 passengers daily

Surrounding area
Sanyo Akashi Station
 Akashi Castle
Akashi Municipal Cultural Museum
 Kobe University Akashi Junior High School, Akashi Elementary

See also
List of railway stations in Japan

References

External links

 JR West Station Official Site

Railway stations in Hyōgo Prefecture
Sanyō Main Line
JR Kobe Line
Railway stations in Japan opened in 1888
Akashi, Hyōgo